Cheranmadevi was an assembly constituency located in Tiruchendur Lok Sabha Constituency in Tamil Nadu. After the realignment of Lok Sabha and Vidhan Sabha segments in 2008, both this assembly segment and its parent parliament seat, ceased to exist.

Members of Legislative Assembly

Election results

2006

2001

1996

1991

1989

1984

1980

1977

1971

1967

1952

References

External links
 

Former assembly constituencies of Tamil Nadu